Khersonotherium is a genus of prehistoric giraffes. Its remains were found in Ukraine and in Africa.

Etymology
The first part of the generic name, "Kherson" refers to a city in Ukraine, where the first specimens were recovered. The second part, therium, comes from the Greek, θηρίον which means "beast".

Distribution
Most fossils of Khersonotherium are found in Ukraine. In Russia and Ukraine the fauna in which it lived is called "hipparionova fauna" - the fauna in which Hipparion was a dominant member. A skeleton of Khersonotherium, found in Odessa, a city in Ukraine, is displayed in Kyiv Paleontological Museum.

Footnotes

External links
Site of Kiev Paleontological Museum

Prehistoric giraffes
Prehistoric even-toed ungulate genera